Indonesia competed at the 1960 Summer Olympics in Rome, Italy. 22 competitors, 20 men and 2 women, took part in 17 events in 8 sports.

Competitors 
The following is the list of number of competitors participating in the Games:

Athletics 

 Key
 Note–Ranks given for track events are within the athlete's heat only
 Q = Qualified for the next round
 q = Qualified for the next round as a fastest loser or, in field events, by position without achieving the qualifying target
 NR = National record
 N/A = Round not applicable for the event
 Bye = Athlete not required to compete in round

Boxing

Cycling 

Four male cyclists represented Indonesia in 1960.

Individual road race
 Hendrik Brocks - (did not advance)
 Rusli Hamsjin - (did not advance)
 Theo Polhaupessy - (did not advance)
 Sanusi - (did not advance)

Team time trial                      *(Rank 26) - 2:34:29.98
 Sanusi
 Rusli Hamsjin
 Theo Polhaupessy
 Hendrik Brocks

Fencing 

Four fencers, two men and two women, represented Indonesia in 1960.

Men's épée
 Andreas Soeratman (Round 1, Rank 6)

Men's sabre
 Jushar Haschja (Round 1, Rank 4)

Women's foil
 Sioe Gouw Pau (Round 1, Rank 4)
 Zuus Undapp (Round 1, Rank 6)

Sailing 

Men

Shooting 

One shooter represented Indonesia in 1960.

50 m pistol
 Sanusi Tjokroadiredjo (57 place) 328 points

Swimming 

Note: * indicates athletes which did not start at the competition

Weightlifting

See also
 1960 Olympic Games
 1960 Paralympic Games
 Indonesia at the Olympics
 Indonesia at the Paralympics

References

External links 
 Official Olympic Reports

Nations at the 1960 Summer Olympics
1960
1960 in Indonesian sport